Parker's Cove or Parkers Cove is a town in the Canadian province of Newfoundland and Labrador. The town had a population of 233 in the Canada 2021 Census, a drop from 248 in 2016.

Demographics 

See also
 List of cities and towns in Newfoundland and Labrador

References

Towns in Newfoundland and Labrador